The Autistic Society of Trinidad and Tobago (ASTT) is a non-governmental organization for families of autistic people in Trinidad and Tobago. It was founded in May 1990 by Teresina Sieunarine. Sieunarine's son was diagnosed with autism in Florida, but on returning to Trinidad she found that there was stigma facing people with disabilities and that some autistic children were living in hospitals. , more than 450 families were registered with the society. The ASTT designates April autism awareness month.

References

External links 
 

Autism-related organizations
Disability organisations based in Trinidad and Tobago
Organizations established in 1990